3-Hydroxybenzoyl-CoA is a molecule formed by condensing the thiol group of coenzyme A (CoA) with the carboxylic acid group of 3-hydroxybenzoic acid. Stable in acidic conditions, it is a tetraprotic acid due to the pyrophosphate and phosphate groups included. It derives from a benzoyl-CoA and a 3-hydroxybenzoic acid. In organisms such as plants, this can be formed using the 3-hydroxybenzoate—CoA ligase enzyme. This uses ATP, 3-hydroxybenzoate, and CoA as substrates.

It can be reduced to 3-hydroxycyclohexa-1,5-diene-1-carbonyl-CoA by reduced ferredoxin and adenosine triphosphate using the benzoyl-CoA reductase enzyme. in this two hydrogen atoms are added to the benzene ring in a dearomatizing process.

References 

Thioesters of coenzyme A